Robert Ogden may refer to:

 Robert Curtis Ogden (1836–1913), American businessman 
 Robert Morris Ogden (1877–1959), American psychologist and academic
 Robert N. Ogden Jr. (1839–1905), American lawyer, soldier, and politician
 Robert Ogden (New Jersey politician) (1716–1765), speaker of the New Jersey assembly and delegate to the Stamp Act Congress

See also
 Robert Ogden Doremus (1824–1906), American chemist and physician
 Robert Ogden Tyler (1831–1874), American soldier and Union Army general